Eskola Cirque is a cirque  wide between Arkell Cirque and Bowen Cirque in the central Read Mountains of the Shackleton Range, in Antarctica. It was photographed from the air by the U.S. Navy, 1967, and surveyed by the British Antarctic Survey, 1968–71. In association with the names of geologists grouped in this area, it was named by the UK Antarctic Place-Names Committee in 1971 after Pentti Eskola, a Finnish geologist who was an authority on the Precambrian rocks of Finland and on silicate melt systems.

References 

Cirques of Coats Land